’Asira al-Qibliya is a Palestinian village in the Nablus Governorate in the eastern West Bank, located  southwest of Nablus. According to the Palestinian Central Bureau of Statistics (PCBS), the village had a population of 2,336 inhabitants in 2007.

Location
It is bordered by  Madama and Burin to the east, Tell and Madama to the north, Tell and Zeita Jamma'in to the west, and Jamma'in and Urif to the south.

History
Asira al-Qibliya is situated on an ancient site on low ground. Carved stones have been reused in village houses and agricultural terraces. Rock-cut cisterns have also been found, together with Byzantine ceramics.

Ottoman era
The village was incorporated into the Ottoman Empire in 1517 with all of Palestine, and in 1596 it appeared in the  tax registers under the name of  'Asirah, as being  in the nahiya of Jabal Qubal, part of Sanjak Nablus. It had a population of 33 households and 6 bachelors, all Muslim. The inhabitants of the village paid fixed tax rate of 33.3% on wheat, barley, summer crops, olive trees, and goats and/or beehives; a total of 5,700 akçe.

In 1838, ‘Asira was located in the District of Jurat 'Amra, south of Nablus.

Victor Guérin visited the village (which he called A'sirah) in 1870, and he estimated it had three hundred inhabitants.  He further noted that the medhafeh, or guest-house, was situated on the highest ground in the village.  

In 1882, the PEF's Survey of Western Palestine (SWP) described Asiret al Kibliyeh as a village of moderate size on low ground, with a well to the south-east.

British Mandate era
In the 1922 census of Palestine, conducted by the British Mandate authorities, ‘Asira al-Qebliyeh  had a population of 282 Muslims,    increasing in the 1931 census  to 326, still all Muslim, in 84 houses.

In the 1945 statistics the population was 410, all Muslims, with 6,437  dunams of land, according to an official land and population survey. Of this, 345 dunams were plantations and irrigable land, 2,963 were used for cereals, while 57 dunams were built-up (urban) land.

Jordanian era
In the wake of the 1948 Arab–Israeli War, and after the 1949 Armistice Agreements, Asira al-Qibliya came under Jordanian rule. 

The Jordanian census of 1961 found 718 inhabitants.

Post-1967
Since the Six-Day War in 1967, Asira al-Qibliya has been under Israeli occupation. 

After the 1995 accords, 72% of village land was classified as Area B, the remaining 28% as Area C. Israel has confiscated 495 dunams of land from Asira al-Qibliya in order to construct the Israeli settlement of Yitzhar.

Settler violence 
Settler violence is a cause for concern. Settlers from the nearby Yitzhar also continue to enter the villages farmlands. From 2008 to 2011, there were numerous reported cases of both violence and arson in the village. As of 2012, Asira Al-Qibiliya and its inhabitants have been repeatedly attacked, targeted and threatened by settlers for which there have been few or no convictions.

In 2012 there were several reported incidents of settler violence. On May 19, 2012, during rock throwing clashes after settlers, apparently from the nearby Yitzhar settlement, came to the village, a settler shot and wounded Fathi Assayara, a 24-year-old Palestinian. Five Palestinians were injured by the rock throwing. According to B'Tselem, IDF soldiers "didn't take any measures to stop the settlers from throwing stones, lighting fires, and firing live rounds at the Palestinians". B'Tselem published several videos of the incident. Abraham Benjamin, spokesman for the Yitzhar settlement, said settlers were responding to series of fires set by "the Arabs from the town" and that "it can be plainly seen that the use of weapons by the IDF or the security team was warranted by a real danger to life".

In mid-2013, the US government requested protection by the IDF for a USAID project that is building a water cistern Asira al-Qibliya. The project and its employees had been repeatedly attacked by settlers from Yitzhar.

The settlers of Yitzhar would  routinely claim that the villagers of Asira al-Qibliya provoked them. The Palestinian villagers were then, in 2012,  given cameras to document the attacks, and the video evidence they provided (and published on YouTube and elsewhere) forced the IDF to act. The result was that the Yitzhar settlers attacked the IDF. By 2014, calls were mounting to classify these Israeli settlers as terrorist. The villagers of Asira al-Qibliya found it a case of  "too little, too late." One villager put it: "It is only words. We don't want words, we want deeds." Israeli writer Amos Oz noted  that “Our neo-Nazi groups enjoy the support of numerous nationalist or even racist legislators."

References

Bibliography

External links
Welcome To 'Asira al-Qibliya
Survey of Western Palestine, Map 11:    IAA, Wikimedia commons  
‘Asira al Qibliya Village Profile, Applied Research Institute–Jerusalem, ARIJ
  Aerial photo, ARIJ
Development Priorities and Needs in ‘Asira al Qibliya, ARIJ
   B'Tselem VIDEO: Israeli settlers attack Asira al-Qibliya at IMEU.net
 Why Israeli Settlers Shot an Unarmed Palestinian, MAY 21 2012, The Atlantic
Israeli settlers filmed firing guns at Palestinians, 21 May 2012, The Guardian
Settlers filmed shooting at Palestinian protesters, 21 May 2012 BBC
Video: Settlers firing at Palestinians,  05/20/2012 Jpost
 Asira al-Qabliiya
 Asira-al-Qibliya

Nablus Governorate
Villages in the West Bank
Municipalities of the State of Palestine